The Advanced Combat Direction System (ACDS) is a centralized, automated command-and-control system, collecting and correlating combat information. It upgrades the Naval Tactical Data System (NTDS) for aircraft carriers and large-deck amphibious ships. A core component of non-Aegis combat systems, ACDS provides the capability to identify and classify targets, prioritize and conduct engagements, vector interceptor aircraft to targets, and exchange targeting information and engagement orders within the battle group and among different service components in the joint theater of operations.  ACDS integrates the ship's sensors, weapons, and intelligence sources to allow command and control of battle group tactical operations.

The ACDS upgrade is divided into two phases designated as Block 0 and Block 1. The Block 0 system replaces obsolete Naval Tactical Data System (NTDS) computers and display consoles with modern equipment and incorporates both new and upgraded NTDS software. Block 1 operates with the equipment provided under ACDS Block 0 but implements significant improvements in software capability. The Block 1 upgrade includes modifiable doctrine, the Joint Tactical Information Distribution System (JTIDS) for joint and allied interoperability, increased range and track capability, multi-source identification, National Geospatial-Intelligence Agency (NGA) based digital maps, and an embedded training capability.

Program Status
ACDS Block 0 was deployed in nine aircraft carriers, five Wasp-class amphibious assault ships, and all five Tarawa-class amphibious assault ships. The first installation of ACDS Block 1 began in FY 1996 with the USS Eisenhower (CVN-69) and Wasp (LHD-1), followed by the USS John F. Kennedy (CV-67) in 1999 and USS Iwo Jima (LHD-7) and USS Nimitz (CVN-68) in 2001. ACDS will be replaced with the Ship Self-Defense System (SSDS) Mark 2 as it is fielded across the fleet.

Developer/Manufacturer
Raytheon, San Diego, California. ACDS Block I development, performance, and integration testing: Raytheon; SPAWAR Systems Center, San Diego, California; and the Integrated Combat Systems Test Facility (ICSTF) and Naval Surface Warfare Center Port Hueneme (NSWC/PHD) (Later, Combat Direction System Activity (CDSA)), Dam Neck, Virginia.

See also
H/ZKJ
Naval Tactical Data System
Ship Self-Defense System

References

Anti-submarine warfare
Military computers
Military equipment introduced in the 1990s